Sherrod Campbell Brown (born November 9, 1952) is an American politician serving as the senior United States senator from Ohio, a seat which he has held since 2007. A member of the Democratic Party, he was the U.S. representative for Ohio's 13th congressional district from 1993 to 2007 and the 47th secretary of state of Ohio from 1983 to 1991. He started his political career in 1975 as an Ohio state representative.

Brown defeated two-term Republican incumbent Mike DeWine in the 2006 U.S. Senate election and was reelected in 2012, defeating state treasurer Josh Mandel, and in 2018, defeating U.S. representative Jim Renacci. In the Senate, he was chair of the Agriculture Subcommittee on Hunger, Nutrition and Family Farms and the Banking Subcommittee on Economic Policy, and is also a member of the Committee on Finance, the Committee on Veterans' Affairs, and Select Committee on Ethics. At the start of the 114th Congress in January 2015, Brown became the ranking Democratic member on the Committee on Banking, Housing, and Urban Affairs. In January 2021, Brown became chair of the committee and initiated an inquiry into the implosion of Archegos Capital Management, an investment firm that was accused of fraud and insider trading and lost billions of dollars.

Brown became the state's senior U.S. senator after the retirement of George Voinovich in 2011. Since then, Brown has been the only Democratic statewide elected official in Ohio, with the exception of some Democratic-affiliated Ohio Supreme Court justices elected in nonpartisan races. He is widely considered a liberal, progressive and populist Democrat.

Early life, education, and academic career

Brown was born in Mansfield, Ohio, the son of Emily (née Campbell) and Charles Gailey Brown, M.D. He has Scottish, Irish, German, and English ancestry, and was named after his maternal grandfather. Brown's brother Charlie served as Attorney General of West Virginia from 1985 to 1989. Brown became an Eagle Scout in 1967, and his badge was presented by John Glenn. In 1970, he graduated from Mansfield Senior High School.

In 1974, Brown received a Bachelor of Arts degree in Russian studies from Yale University. While at Yale, he lived in Davenport College, and he campaigned for George McGovern during the 1972 presidential election. He went on to receive a Master of Arts degree in education and a Master of Public Administration degree from the Ohio State University at Columbus in 1979 and 1981, respectively. He taught at the Mansfield branch campus of the Ohio State University from 1979 to 1981.

Early political career

During his senior year in college, Brown was recruited by a local Democratic leader to run for Ohio's state house. Brown served as a state representative in Ohio from 1974 to 1982. At the time of his election to the Ohio House, he was the youngest person elected to that body. In 1982 Brown ran for Ohio Secretary of State to succeed Anthony J. Celebrezze Jr. He won a four-way Democratic primary that included Dennis Kucinich, then defeated Republican Virgil Brown in the general election. In 1986 Brown was reelected, defeating Vincent C. Campanella. As Secretary of State, Brown focused on voter registration outreach. In 1990 he lost reelection in a heated campaign against Republican Bob Taft, the great-grandson of President William Howard Taft. This is the only time Brown has lost an election.

U.S. House of Representatives

1992 election

	
In 1992, Brown moved from Mansfield to Lorain, Ohio, and won a heavily contested Democratic primary for the open seat for Ohio's 13th district, in the western and southern suburbs of Cleveland, after eight-term incumbent Don Pease announced his retirement. The Democratic-leaning district gave him an easy win over the little-known Republican Margaret R. Mueller. He was reelected six times.

Tenure
The Democrats lost their long-held House majority in the 1994 elections, and stayed in the minority for the remainder of Brown's tenure. As ranking member of the Energy and Commerce Health subcommittee, Brown successfully advocated for increased funding to fight tuberculosis.

In 2005, Brown led the Democratic effort to block the Central American Free Trade Agreement (CAFTA). For many months, Brown worked as whip on the issue, securing Democratic "nay" votes and seeking Republican allies. After several delays, the House of Representatives finally voted on CAFTA after midnight on July 28, 2005, passing it by one vote.

Brown opposed an amendment to Ohio's constitution that banned same-sex marriage. He was also one of the few U.S. Representatives to vote against the Defense of Marriage Act in 1996.

Committee assignments
Brown was the ranking minority member on the House Energy and Commerce Committee's Health Subcommittee. He also served on the Subcommittee on Telecommunications and the Internet and the Subcommittee on Commerce, Trade and Consumer Protection. While serving on the House International Relations Committee, he was also a member of the Subcommittee on Asia and the Pacific.

U.S. Senate

Elections

2006

In August 2005 Brown announced he would not run for the United States Senate seat held by two-term Republican incumbent Mike DeWine, but in October he reconsidered his decision. His announcement came shortly after Democrat Paul Hackett stated that he would soon announce his candidacy. On February 13, 2006, Hackett withdrew from the race, all but ensuring that Brown would win the Democratic nomination. In the May 2 primary Brown won 78.05% of the Democratic vote. His opponent, Merrill Samuel Keiser Jr., received 21.95%.

In April 2006, Brown, along with John Conyers, brought an action against George W. Bush and others, alleging violations of the Constitution in the passage of the Deficit Reduction Act of 2005. The case, Conyers v. Bush, was ultimately dismissed for lack of standing.

On November 7, 2006, Brown defeated DeWine, 56% to 44%.

2012

Brown ran for reelection in 2012, facing opponent Josh Mandel, who in 2010 had defeated the incumbent state treasurer by 14 points. Mandel raised $2.3 million in the second quarter of 2011 alone, to Brown's $1.5 million. Early on Brown enjoyed a steady lead in the polls. Mandel won the March Republican primary with 63% of the vote.

The Washington Post reported that no candidate running for reelection (save Barack Obama) faced more opposition from outside groups in 2012 than Brown did. As of April 2012 over $5.1 million had been spent on television ads opposing him, according to data provided by a Senate Democratic campaign operative. The United States Chamber of Commerce spent $2.7 million. 60 Plus Association, a conservative group that opposes health care reform, spent another $1.4 million. Karl Rove's Crossroads GPS and the Concerned Women for America Legislative Action Committee also spent heavily in the race. In May 2012 Brown campaigned with West Wing actor Martin Sheen.

On November 6, 2012, Brown held his seat, winning 50.7% of the vote to Mandel's 44.7%. Independent candidate Scott Rupert received 4.6% of the vote.

2018

In 2018 Brown was reelected to a third Senate term, defeating Republican U.S. Representative Jim Renacci by 6.8 points.

Tenure
A staunch critic of free trade who has taken progressive stances on financial issues, Brown has said that the Democratic Party should place stronger emphasis on progressive populism.

In March 2018, Brown was appointed co-chair of the newly formed Joint Multiemployer Pension Solvency Committee.

On March 11, 2020, the day the WHO declared COVID-19 a pandemic, Brown proposed a bill that would let workers immediately receive paid sick days, allowing them to stay home and self-quarantine if feeling sick or in the event of any public health emergency. He noted it could slow infection spread to coworkers and criticized Republicans for blocking the proposal, although he said he believed the House would pass similar legislation.

After President Donald Trump was impeached for the first time in December 2019, Brown voted to remove him from office. During  the January 2020 impeachment trial, Brown said he was fine with Republicans bringing witnesses to testify so long as they allowed testimony from witnesses such as John Bolton.

In January 2020, Brown called on his Senate colleagues to approve legislation that would improve the EPA's regulation of perfluoroalkyl and polyfluoroalkyl substances.

In February 2020, Brown and other Democrats in the house voted to block two pieces of anti-abortion legislation: the Born-Alive Abortion Survivors Protection Act and the Pain Capable Unborn Child Protection Act. The same month, Brown introduced the Neighborhood Homes Investment Act to the Senate.

Committee assignments (117th Congress)

 Committee on Agriculture, Nutrition, and Forestry

 Committee on Banking, Housing, and Urban Affairs (Chairman)
 As chairman of the whole committee, Brown serves as an ex officio member on all the subcommittees.

 Committee on Finance

 Committee on Veterans' Affairs

Potential national campaigns
One of Bernie Sanders's closest allies in the U.S. Senate, Brown nevertheless endorsed Hillary Clinton and campaigned for her in the 2016 Democratic presidential primary in Ohio. He was vetted as a potential vice-presidential running mate for Clinton. The choice came down to Brown and Tim Kaine, who was ultimately selected. Brown had the distinct disadvantage that had Clinton won, Ohio's Republican Governor John Kasich would have chosen Brown's replacement in the Senate, whereas Kaine's replacement would be chosen by Democrat and Clinton ally Virginia governor Terry McAuliffe.

In May 2017 Washington Monthly suggested that Brown could unite the establishment and progressive wings of the Democratic Party as a presidential candidate in 2020. On November 12, 2018, Cleveland.com reported that Brown was "seriously" considering a presidential run,
After winning his third Senate term in the 2018 election, Brown was considered a potential candidate for the Democratic presidential nomination in 2020 and began exploring a run in January 2019. On March 7, 2019, he announced that he would not run for president. and on March 9, 2019, Brown said he would not run for president and would remain a senator. He also said he has no interest in being vice president.

Political positions
In the 2011 National Journal annual rankings, Brown tied with eight other members for the title of the most liberal member of Congress. According to FiveThirtyEight, Brown voted with President Donald Trump's position on Congressional issues 25.8% of the time.

In a 2017 issue of Dissent, Michael Kazin introduced an interview with Brown by praising him as "a politician ahead of his time" and "perhaps the most class-conscious Democrat in Washington." Brown told Kazin that many Ohioans think "people on the coasts look down on them" and blamed this notion on Fox News and The Wall Street Journal.

Agriculture 
In April 2019, Brown was one of seven senators led by Debbie Stabenow and Joni Ernst to sign a letter to U.S. Secretary of Agriculture Sonny Perdue urging the Agriculture Department to implement conservation measures in the 2018 Farm Bill "through a department-wide National Water Quality Initiative, which would build off the existing initiative housed at the Natural Resource Conservation Service."

Biden
According to FiveThirtyEight, during the 117th Congress, Brown voted with President Joe Biden's stated position 98% of the time.

Corporate PAC money 
Brown has sponsored legislation to require corporate political action committees to disclose their donors, but as of 2023 he continues to accept PAC donations.

In 2019, when Brown was considering running for president, he pledged not to take donations from corporate PACs. He had accepted more than $10.4 million in PAC money from 1997 to 2018. Since Brown declined to seek the presidency in 2019, his Senate campaign committee and leadership PAC have accepted over $1 million in corporate PAC donations.

Economy 
In March 2019, Brown was one of six senators to sign a letter to the Federal Trade Commission requesting that it "use its rulemaking authority, along with other tools, in order to combat the scourge of non-compete clauses rigging our economy against workers" and saying that non-compete clauses "harm employees by limiting their ability to find alternate work, which leaves them with little leverage to bargain for better wages or working conditions with their immediate employer." The senators' letter added that the FTC had the responsibility of protecting both consumers and workers and needed to "act decisively" to address their concerns over "serious anti-competitive harms from the proliferation of non-competes in the economy."

Foreign policy

Brown opposed the Iraq War and voted against the Iraq Resolution as a House Representative. He voted against the $87 billion war budgetary supplement. He also voted for redeploying US troops out of Iraq by March 2008. Brown voted for the Supplemental Appropriations Act, 2008, which appropriated $250 billion for ongoing military operations and domestic programs.

In December 2010, Brown voted for the ratification of New START, a nuclear arms reduction treaty between the United States and the Russian Federation obliging both countries to have no more than 1,550 strategic warheads and 700 launchers deployed during the next seven years, and providing for a continuation of on-site inspections that halted when START I expired the previous year. It was the first arms treaty with Russia in eight years.

In 2012, Brown co-sponsored a resolution to "oppose any policy that would rely on containment as an option in response to the Iranian nuclear threat." In 2015, he co-sponsored an amendment to the budget that was unanimously approved by the Senate and that would reimpose sanctions on Iran if Iran violated the terms of the interim or final agreement by advancing its nuclear program.

Brown was a co-sponsor of reaffirmations of the Taiwan Relations Act and the Six Assurances in regards to United States-Taiwan relations. Weeks after the 2014 Hong Kong class boycott campaign and Umbrella Movement broke out, demanding genuine universal suffrage among other goals, Brown (the chair of the Congressional-Executive Commission on China), co-chair Chris Smith, U.S. Senators Ben Cardin, Marco Rubio, Roger Wicker, Dianne Feinstein, and Jeff Merkley, and U.S. Representatives Nancy Pelosi, Dan Lipinski and Frank Wolf introduced the Hong Kong Human Rights and Democracy Act, which would update the United States–Hong Kong Policy Act of 1992 and U.S. commitment to democratic development in Hong Kong.

In September 2016, in advance of UN Security Council resolution 2334 condemning Israeli settlements in the occupied Palestinian territories, Brown signed an AIPAC-sponsored letter urging President Obama to veto "one-sided" resolutions against Israel. In February 2019, Brown voted against a controversial Israel Anti-Boycott Act initiated by Republicans that would allow states to prohibit government agencies from contracting with organizations involved in the Boycott, Divestment and Sanctions movement.

In June 2017, Brown criticized U.S. support for Saudi Arabia's military campaign in Yemen, saying, "It's becoming increasingly clear that Saudi Arabia has been deliberately targeting civilian targets. And that's absolutely unacceptable". In July 2017, he voted for the Countering America's Adversaries Through Sanctions Act, which placed sanctions on Iran, Russia, and North Korea. In May 2018, Brown, Bob Menendez and Mark Warner wrote to the inspectors general of the State Department, Treasury Department and Intelligence Community, to allege that the Trump administration had failed to fully comply with the provisions of the CAATSA and request investigations into that. In October 2018, Brown condemned the genocide of the Rohingya Muslim minority in Myanmar and called for a stronger response to the crisis.

In May 2018, Brown was one of 12 senators to sign a letter to Trump urging him not to withdraw from the Iran nuclear deal on the grounds that "Iran could either remain in the agreement and seek to isolate the United States from our closest partners, or resume its nuclear activities" if the U.S. pulled out and that both possibilities "would be detrimental to our national security interests." In August 2018, Brown and 16 other members of Congress urged the U.S. to impose sanctions under the Global Magnitsky Act against Chinese officials responsible for human rights abuses against the Uyghur Muslim minority in western China's Xinjiang region.

In November 2018, Brown joined Senators Chris Coons, Elizabeth Warren and a bipartisan group of lawmakers in sending the Trump administration a letter raising concerns about the People's Republic of China's undue influence on media outlets and academic institutions in the United States. They wrote: "In American news outlets, Beijing has used financial ties to suppress negative information about the CCP. In the past four years, multiple media outlets with direct or indirect financial ties to China allegedly decided not to publish stories on wealth and corruption in the CCP. In one case, an editor resigned due to mounting self-censorship in the outlet's China coverage. Beijing has also sought to use relationships with American academic institutions and student groups to shape public discourse."

In January 2019, after Juan Guaidó declared himself interim President of Venezuela, Brown said that the United States should "work with our allies and use economic, political and diplomatic leverage to help bring about free and fair elections, limit escalating tension, and ensure the safety of Americans on the ground", and called the Trump administration's suggestions of military intervention "reckless and irresponsible".

Terrorism
Brown was one of 67 members of Congress who voted against the 2001 USA PATRIOT Act.

In December 2015, Brown co-sponsored a bill in Congress that would restrict ISIS's financing by authorizing new sanctions on foreign financial institutions that knowingly facilitate financial transactions with ISIS. The bill called for tightening international passport regulations and additional screening of persons attempting to enter the U.S. on certain types of visas. The bill would also provide grants to local law enforcement agencies to train for active shooter situations and terrorist attacks and to conduct cyber-training to identify and track extremists such as the couple behind the 2015 San Bernardino attack. Brown also called for banning those on the no fly list from purchasing assault weapons.

Tax
Brown's opposition to the 2017 tax bill led to what was described as a "shouting match" with Senator Orrin Hatch of Utah, who accused Brown of "spouting off" to the effect that the tax bill benefited the rich.

In March 2018, Vice President Mike Pence criticized Brown for his recent vote against the Republican tax bill (the TCJA). Brown had argued the bill overwhelmingly benefited wealthy individuals and corporations with a much smaller impact to the middle class.

Veterans

In 2014, Brown introduced the Gold Star Fathers Act of 2014 (S. 2323; 113th Congress), a bill that would expand preferred eligibility for federal jobs to the fathers of certain permanently disabled or deceased veterans. He said that "when a service member is killed in action or permanently and totally disabled, the government should do its part to be there for grieving parents—no matter if they're fathers or mothers."

In 2015, Brown and Representative Tim Ryan introduced legislation that would give military veterans priority in scheduling classes in colleges, universities, and other post-secondary education programs.

Energy and environment
In 2012, Brown co-sponsored the Responsible Electronics Recycling Act, a bill that would prohibit the export of some electronics for environmental reasons. In 2018, his Water Resources Development Act was signed by Donald Trump to invest in "clean water infrastructure and build or update water and sewer systems."

Gun rights
Brown has criticized the political influence of gun manufacturers.

Brown called the Republican legislature in Ohio "lunatics" for introducing a concealed carry bill that would allow individuals to carry guns into airplane terminals (before security), police buildings, private airplanes, and day care facilities.

In the wake of the Orlando nightclub shooting, Brown participated in the Chris Murphy gun control filibuster. A few weeks later, Brown voted for the Feinstein Amendment, which would have barred any individual on the terrorist watchlist from buying a gun.

In the wake of the Killing of John Crawford III, Brown came to Dayton, Ohio to provide support.

In response to the 2017 Las Vegas shooting, Brown supported Dianne Feinstein's effort to ban bump stocks.

Banking and finance industry
In February 2013, conservative commentator George F. Will wrote in support of Brown's proposal to break up consolidated banks and finance industry conglomerates by restoring the Glass-Steagall Act.

In 2016, after the leak of the Panama Papers, Brown and Elizabeth Warren urged the Treasury Department to investigate whether U.S. individuals were involved in possible tax avoidance and misconduct associated with the Panama-based law firm Mossack Fonseca.

Stimulus spending
In 2009, Brown voted for the $787-billion American Recovery and Reinvestment Act of 2009. He cast the 60th and final vote upon returning to Washington, DC, after his mother's funeral service.

Flint water crisis
In the wake of the Flint water crisis, Brown introduced legislation that would force the federal government to step in when cities and states fail to warn residents about lead-contaminated drinking water and to give Ohio's school districts money to test it.

Health care

Brown supported the Patient Protection and Affordable Care Act, voting for it in December 2009, and he voted for the Health Care and Education Reconciliation Act of 2010.

In 2006, Brown co-sponsored the single-payer Expanded and Improved Medicare for All Act. He did not co-sponsor Senator Bernie Sanders's single-payer health plan, despite saying he has "always been supportive" of such a system. Brown said he was supporting his own plan, which would allow people 55 and older to buy into Medicare.

In January 2019, Brown was one of six Democratic senators to introduce the American Miners Act of 2019, a bill that would amend the Surface Mining Control and Reclamation Act of 1977 to swap funds in excess of the amount needed to meet existing obligations under the Abandoned Mine Land fund to the 1974 Pension Plan as part of an effort to prevent its insolvency as a result of coal company bankruptcies and the 2008 financial crisis. It also increased the Black Lung Disability Trust Fund tax and ensured that miners affected by the 2018 coal company bankruptcies would not lose their health insurance.

In August 2019 Brown was one of 19 senators to sign a letter to United States Secretary of the Treasury Steve Mnuchin and United States Secretary of Health and Human Services Alex Azar requesting data from the Trump administration in order to help states and Congress understand the potential consequences of the Texas v. United States Affordable Care Act lawsuit, writing that an overhaul of the present health care system would form "an enormous hole in the pocketbooks of the people we serve as well as wreck state budgets".

In September 2019, amid discussions to prevent a government shutdown, Brown was one of six Democratic senators to sign a letter to congressional leadership advocating the passage of legislation that would permanently fund health care and pension benefits for retired coal miners as "families in Virginia, West Virginia, Wyoming, Alabama, Colorado, North Dakota and New Mexico" would start to receive notifications of health care termination by the end of the following month.

Housing 
In April 2019, Brown was one of 41 senators to sign a bipartisan letter to the housing subcommittee praising the United States Department of Housing and Urban Development's Section 4 Capacity Building program as authorizing "HUD to partner with national nonprofit community development organizations to provide education, training, and financial support to local community development corporations (CDCs) across the country" and expressing disappointment that President Trump's budget "has slated this program for elimination after decades of successful economic and community development." The senators wrote of their hope that the subcommittee would support continued funding for Section 4 in Fiscal Year 2020.

LGBT rights
Brown voted against prohibiting same-sex couples from adopting children in Washington D.C. He received a 100% score from the Human Rights Campaign in 2005–2006, indicating a pro-gay rights stance. On December 18, 2010, he voted in favor of the Don't Ask, Don't Tell Repeal Act of 2010.

In October 2018, Brown was one of 20 senators to sign a letter to Secretary of State Mike Pompeo urging him to reverse the rolling back of a policy that granted visas to same-sex partners of LGBTQ diplomats who had unions that were not recognized by their home countries, writing that too many places around the world have seen LGBTQ individuals "subjected to discrimination and unspeakable violence, and receive little or no protection from the law or local authorities" and that refusing to let LGBTQ diplomats bring their partners to the US would be equivalent of upholding "the discriminatory policies of many countries around the world."

Education

In 2015, Brown introduced the Charter School Accountability Act of 2015, which would seek to curb "fraud, abuse, waste, mismanagement and misconduct" in charter schools.

Brown praised West Virginia teachers who held a nine-day strike in early 2018, saying: "When this society fails to pay its teachers a living wage, it's pretty shameful. Those teachers engaged the public to put pressure on a Republican legislature that historically underfunds education and they got the legislature to finally do the right thing. So I was proud of those teachers for standing up." He also praised other recent activist demonstrations, such as the gun violence protests by Parkland High School students in Florida and the Women's March after President Trump's inauguration, saying: "That's what makes our country great — when people stand up and push back when they're mistreated."

Immigration 
In July 2019, following reports that the Trump administration intended to cease protecting spouses, parents and children of active-duty service members from deportation, Brown was one of 22 senators led by Tammy Duckworth to sign a letter arguing that the protection gave service members the ability "to fight for the United States overseas and not worry that their spouse, children, or parents will be deported while they are away" and that its termination would both cause service members personal hardship and negatively affect their combat performance.

Intellectual property
Brown was a cosponsor of the Protect-IP Act (PIPA).

Opioids 
In February 2017, Brown and 30 other senators signed a letter to Kaléo Pharmaceuticals in response to an increase of the opioid-overdose-reversing device Evzio's price from $690 in 2014 to $4,500. They requested the detailed price structure for Evzio, the number of devices Kaléo Pharmaceuticals set aside for donation, and the totality of federal reimbursements Evzio received in the previous year.

Railroad safety 
In June 2019, Brown was one of ten senators to cosponsor the Safe Freight Act, a bill that would require freight trains to have one or more certified conductors and a certified engineer on board who can collaborate on how to protect the train and people living near the tracks. The legislation was meant to correct a Federal Railroad Administration rollback of a proposed rule intended to establish safety standards.

Trade

Brown has criticized free trade with China and other countries. In a 2006 Washington Post article, Brown argued against free trade on the grounds that labor activism was responsible for the growth of the U.S. middle class, and that the U.S. economy is harmed by trade relations with countries that lack the kind of labor regulations that have resulted from that activism.

In 2011, the Columbus Dispatch noted that Brown "loves to rail against international trade agreements." Brown's book Myths of Free Trade argues that "an unregulated global economy is a threat to all of us." In the book he recommends measures that would allow for emergency tariffs, protect Buy America laws, including those that give preference to minority and women-owned businesses, and hold foreign producers to American labor and environmental standards. Brown was the co-author and sponsor of a bill that would officially declare China a currency manipulator and require the Department of Commerce to impose countervailing duties on Chinese imports.

In May 2016, Brown called for tariffs to be imposed on imports from China and praised Hillary Clinton's plan to enforce rules and trade laws and triple the enforcement budgets at the United States Department of Commerce and the International Trade Commission.

Brown opposes NAFTA, which he argues should be renegotiated to aid Ohio workers.

In January 2018, Brown expressed support for President Trump's decision to impose tariffs on washing machine imports. He supported his first trade agreement in 2019, after never having previously supported one while in Congress. He voted against the North American Free Trade Agreement because he said it would send Ohioan jobs to Mexico, but supported a new trade agreement for United States, Mexico and Canada after a "step toward a pro-worker trade policy, but it's not a perfect agreement."

Employment
In 2012, Brown wrote a letter to the United States Department of Defense requesting that it comply with a rule requiring members of the military to wear clothes made in the U.S.

In a 2016 CNN interview, Brown criticized Trump for making "a lot of money apparently by outsourcing jobs to China."

Personal life

Brown was married to Larke Recchie from 1979 to 1987, and they had two children. During their divorce proceedings, Recchie obtained a restraining order against Brown to keep him from harassing or annoying her and from "doing bodily harm". In a supporting affidavit, she said she was "in fear for the safety and well-being of myself and our children due to [Brown's] physical violence and abusive nature" and that Brown had "intimidated, pushed, shoved and bullied" her on several occasions. Years later, Recchie walked back her claims of physical violence against Brown.

Recchie and Cleveland Plain Dealer columnist Connie Schultz later became friends and filmed an ad together for Brown's 2006 Senate campaign. Recchie hosted a fund-raising event for Brown's 2012 reelection campaign against Republican Josh Mandel and issued a statement saying, "I understand that in campaigns you often have to go after your opponent, but Josh Mandel should know better than to go after our family. I ask that he immediately put a stop to this kind of politics. I was proud to support Sherrod in 2006 and I'm proud to support him again this time around against Josh Mandel. Josh Mandel should immediately stop this kind of dirty campaigning."

In 2004, Brown married Schultz. She resigned from her job in 2011, because being a politician's spouse presented a conflict of interest. She won a Pulitzer Prize in 2005. She is also the author of Life Happens (2007) and ...and His Lovely Wife (2008), in which she describes her experiences as the spouse of a U.S. Senate candidate. He has two stepchildren from this marriage.

Brown's daughter Elizabeth was president pro tempore of the Columbus City Council and served on the council for seven years. He has five grandchildren. He is Lutheran.

Brown's brother, Charlie, is a former West Virginia attorney general.

On May 5, 2007, Brown was awarded an honorary doctorate from Capital University.

On May 18, 2014, Brown was awarded an honorary doctor of public service degree from Otterbein University. Along with his wife, Brown delivered a keynote address at the undergraduate commencement.

In 2015, the Boy Scouts of America gave Brown the Distinguished Eagle Scout Award.

Bibliography
Brown is the author of three books:

 Congress from the Inside: Observations from the Majority and the Minority, Kent State University Press, 2004, 
 Myths of Free Trade: Why American Trade Policy Has Failed, The New Press, 2006, 
 Desk 88: Eight Progressive Senators Who Changed America, Farrar, Straus & Giroux, 2019,

Electoral history

See also
Ohio United States Senate elections
List of United States senators from Ohio
Currency Exchange Rate Oversight Reform Act of 2011
Brown–Kaufman amendment
List of Eagle Scouts

References

External links

Sherrod Brown official U.S. Senate website
Sherrod Brown for Senate 

Sherrod Brown columns at HuffPost
Collected news and commentary at the Cleveland Plain Dealer

 
1952 births
20th-century American politicians
21st-century American politicians
American educators
American Lutherans
Lutherans from Ohio
Democratic Party United States senators from Ohio
John Glenn College of Public Affairs alumni
Ohio State University faculty
Left-wing populism in the United States
Living people
Democratic Party members of the Ohio House of Representatives
Politicians from Mansfield, Ohio
Secretaries of State of Ohio
Democratic Party members of the United States House of Representatives from Ohio
Writers from Ohio
Yale University alumni
Ohio State University College of Education and Human Ecology alumni